Altinaghree Castle or Liscloon House, known locally as Ogilby's Castle, is a large, derelict building situated outside Donemana, County Tyrone, Northern Ireland. It is believed to have been built around 1860 by William Ogilby.

Location
Near Donemana, County Tyrone, Northern Ireland

Description
Altinaghree Castle is a derelict castle situated on private farmland outside Donemana, south of Londonderry in County Tyrone.

The building is also known as Altnacree Castle, Liscloon House, and is known locally as Ogilby's Castle. It was once a large elegant building with magnificent banquet room, but is now in ruins. The building is constructed from cut stone.

Facilities
The castle is on private land and is not open to the public, but can be seen and photographed from the main Dunamanagh – Claudy Road (B49).

History
The castle is believed to have been built by William Ogilby around 1860. His son, James Douglas Ogilby, later became a famous ichthyologist in Australia. James fell in love with a factory seamstress, Mary Jane Jamieson, and was denied permission to marry her because she was a Catholic. They eloped and married in 1884. He moved to Australia where he was appointed to the Australian Museum in 1885. The castle was abandoned by the end of the century and fell into disrepair.

References

See also
Castles in Northern Ireland

Castles in County Tyrone
Ruined castles in Northern Ireland